YSR Vahana Mitra is a program launched by the Government of Andhra Pradesh to financially assist self employed drivers of autos, taxis and maxi-cabs.

Development 
YSR Vahana Mitra was launched by Chief minister of Andhra Pradesh Y. S. Jagan Mohan Reddy on 4 October 2019 in order to assist auto, taxi and maxi-cab drivers from poor economic background by providing the financial assistance of ₹10,000 per year.

2,36,344 people were benefited by the scheme during 2019-20 whereas 2,73,985 beneficiaries were benefited during 2020-21. The financial aid was delivered four months prior to the announced date in 2020 in effect with the COVID-19 pandemic crisis.

84% of the beneficiaries hail from SC, ST, BC and minority communities.

The scheme 
As promised by Y. S. Jagan Mohan Reddy during padayatra on 14 May 2018 as part of the election campaign in Eluru, the scheme was launched in the same city on 4 October 2019. Under the scheme, self employed drivers owning auto rikshaws, taxis and maxi-cabs are financially assisted with ₹10,000 per annum to help with the maintenance, insurance and other expenses of the vehicles.

References 

Government welfare schemes in Andhra Pradesh